Aboubacar Fofana is a French former footballer who played as a midfielder.

Football career
In August 2003 Fofana was signed for Mark McGhee's side Millwall, after being released by Italian giants Juventus after an unsuccessful one-year loan with Greek Super League side PAOK. He played his first game for The Lions when they played Gillingham on 6 September 2003, in which Gillingham won 4-3. Fofana played 16 more games after that and was released in 2004. He transferred to Malian side Jeanne d'Arc FC.

Honours
Juventus
Serie A: (1)
2002

Coppa Italia: (1)
2002

P.A.O.K.
Greek Cup: (1)
2003

Millwall
FA Cup: (1) Finalists
2004

Séwé Sports
Ligue 1: (1)
2012.

 Coupe Houphouët-Boigny: (1)
2012.

References

External links
Eurosport.fr Profile 
Soccerbase.com Profile

Living people
1982 births
French footballers
French sportspeople of Ivorian descent
Association football midfielders
Juventus F.C. players
PAOK FC players
Millwall F.C. players
FK Dukla Banská Bystrica players
Serie A players
Super League Greece players
Slovak Super Liga players
English Football League players
French expatriate footballers
Expatriate footballers in Italy
Expatriate footballers in Greece
Expatriate footballers in England
Expatriate footballers in Belgium
French expatriate sportspeople in Italy
French expatriate sportspeople in Greece
French expatriate sportspeople in England